A list of films produced in Russia in 2019 (see 2019 in film).

Film releases

Cultural Russian films
 Anna is a 2019 French action thriller film directed by Luc Besson and starring Sasha Luss.
 The Prisoner of Sakura (Japanese: ソローキンの見た桜, Russian: В плену у сакуры) is a 2019 Japanese drama film directed by Masaki Inoue.
 Proxima is a 2019 French drama film directed by Alice Winocour.
 The Russian Bride is an 2019 American thriller horror film directed by Michael S. Ojeda and starring Kristina Pimenova.
 See You Soon is a 2019 American romance film directed by David Mahmoudieh.
 Sin is a 2019 Italian biographical drama film directed by Andrei Konchalovsky.

See also 
 2019 in film
 2019 in Russia

References

External links 

2019
Films
Lists of 2019 films by country or language